Coleophora raphidon is a moth of the family Coleophoridae. It is found in Russia.

References

raphidon
Moths of Asia
Moths described in 2002